Vincent Viot (born 17 May 1994) is a French professional footballer who plays as goalkeeper for  club Orléans.

Career
Viot trained at Le Mans FC, before spending two seasons with Vendée Luçon Football as number two goalkeeper. He signed for Béziers in August 2016 when Luçon filed for bankruptcy.

Viot made his debut at the professional level for Béziers in a 2–1 Ligue 2 loss to AC Ajaccio on 11 January 2019. In June 2020 he signed a two-year deal with Concarneau as their first choice goalkeeper.

On 26 May 2022, Viot signed with Orléans for the 2022–23 season.

References

External links
 
 
 
  
  

1994 births
Living people
Footballers from Le Mans
French footballers
Association football goalkeepers
Ligue 2 players
Championnat National players
Championnat National 2 players
AS Béziers (2007) players
Le Mans FC players
US Concarneau players
US Orléans players